Child's Play (also known colloquially as Chucky) is an American horror media franchise created by Don Mancini. The films mainly focus on Chucky (voiced by Brad Dourif in the original films and television series, and Mark Hamill in the reboot with Brad Dourif partially voicing the character in the reboot), a notorious serial killer who frequently escapes death by performing a voodoo ritual to transfer his soul into a "Good Guy" doll. The original film, Child's Play, was released on November 9, 1988. The film has spawned six sequels, a television series, a remake, comic books, a video game, and tie-in merchandise. The first, second, and fourth films were box office successes with all of the films earning over $182 million worldwide. Including revenues from sales of videos, DVDs, VOD and merchandise, the franchise has generated over $250 million. It also won a Saturn Award for Best Horror Franchise.

Cult of Chucky, was released in October 2017. The television series titled Chucky aired on October 12, 2021, on Syfy and USA Network.

Several short films have been made featuring the Chucky character: on the DVD release of Seed of Chucky, a short film entitled Chucky's Vacation Slides, set after the shooting of the film, was included, and a series of short films inserting Chucky into the events of other horror films entitled Chucky Invades was released in the run-up to the release of Curse of Chucky. On television, Chucky has appeared in commercials and also on Saturday Night Live, with a separate voice actor voicing the character. Chucky appeared in a pre-taped segment during an October 1998 episode of World Championship Wrestling's Monday Nitro program as a heel, taunting wrestler Rick Steiner who was a face at the time and promoting Bride of Chucky. He later appeared on WWE's NXT program for the special "Halloween Havoc" episodes in October 2021 and 2022, in which Chucky served as a host to announce several of the matches. These appearances were to promote the Chucky TV series.

Films

Child's Play (1988)

Directed by Tom Holland from a story by Holland, John Lafia, and Don Mancini, Child's Play was released on November 9, 1988. It was the first film in the series and the only film (not counting the 2019 reboot) to be distributed by Metro-Goldwyn-Mayer/United Artists before the franchise was sold to Universal Pictures. The film starred Catherine Hicks, Chris Sarandon, Brad Dourif, and Alex Vincent in his first film performance.

Gunned down by Detective Mike Norris, dying murderer Charles Lee Ray uses voodoo magic to put his soul inside a doll named Chucky—which Karen Barclay buys for her young son, Andy. When Chucky kills Andy's babysitter, the boy realizes the doll is alive and tries to warn people, but he's institutionalized. Now Karen must convince the detective of the murderous doll's intentions, before Andy becomes Chucky's next victim.

Child's Play 2 (1990)

Directed by John Lafia, from a story by Don Mancini, and released on November 9, 1990, Child's Play 2 is the second film in the series and the first film produced by Universal Pictures. The film sees Alex Vincent and Brad Dourif reprise their respective roles as Andy Barclay and the voice of Chucky, while Christine Elise plays Andy's foster sister, Kyle.

Two years after serial killer Charles Lee Ray inserted his soul into a Chucky doll, a toy company attempts to re-create the doll, bringing Ray back in the process. The possessed doll, intent on claiming a human body, kills his way toward former owner Andy, who now lives in a foster home. Andy's foster sister, Kyle, tries to protect him, but his foster parents believe Andy is just a troubled kid—and Chucky's murderous path continues.

Child's Play 3 (1991)

Directed by Jack Bender from a story by Don Mancini and released on August 30, 1991, Child's Play 3 is the third and last film in the series to be titled Child's Play, as all future installments would later use the title Chucky (prior to the 2019 reboot). The film saw Justin Whalin (replacing Alex Vincent) as Andy Barclay, while Perrey Reeves and Jeremy Sylvers play new characters Kristin De Silva and Ronald Tyler. Brad Dourif reprised his role as the voice of Chucky, becoming the only actor to appear in all films.

It's been years since Chucky, the doll with the soul and the voice of a psychopathic killer, was apparently destroyed at a doll factory. Now Chucky's manufacturer is remaking the same line of toys with the old, still haunted materials. This resurrects Chucky, who goes after Andy, his former owner, who now attends military school. Chucky slashes his way through a string of grotesque murders as Andy tries to stop the homicidal doll and the spirit within it.

Bride of Chucky (1998)

Directed by Ronny Yu from a story by Don Mancini and released on October 16, 1998, Bride of Chucky is the fourth film in the franchise, and the first film to be titled Chucky. The film once again sees Brad Dourif reprising his role of Chucky, while Jennifer Tilly, Nick Stabile, and Katherine Heigl play new characters.  Unlike the first three films, this film focuses almost entirely on the titular dolls.

After being cut apart in the previous film, killer doll Chucky is resurrected by Tiffany, his ex-girlfriend. Following an argument, Chucky kills Tiffany, transferring her soul into a bride doll. To find the magical amulet that can restore them both to human form, Chucky and Tiffany arrange to be driven to New Jersey by Jesse and Jade, a teenage couple who are unaware that their cargo is alive.

Seed of Chucky (2004)

Directed and written by Don Mancini and released on November 11, 2004, Seed of Chucky is the fifth installment of the series and the second film not to be distributed by Universal Pictures. The film stars Brad Dourif, reprising his role as Chucky, Jennifer Tilly, reprising her role as Tiffany Valentine, while also playing a fictional version of herself, and Billy Boyd as their child, Glen/Glenda.

Gentle Glen is a ventriloquist's dummy, the offspring of evil dolls Chucky and Tiffany, both of whom are now deceased. When the orphaned Glen hears that a film is being made about his parents, he goes to Hollywood and resurrects them in an attempt to get to know them better. He is horrified when his parents embark on a new killing spree, and Chucky is equally horrified that his son has no taste for evil.

Curse of Chucky (2013)

Directed and written by Don Mancini and released on October 8, 2013, Curse of Chucky is the sixth film in the series, and the first direct-to-video installment. It stars Brad Dourif, reprising the role from previous films, while his daughter, Fiona Dourif, plays new character Nica Pierce.

Looking for revenge, Chucky the killer doll infiltrates and terrorises the family of a woman, her sister, and her young niece.

Cult of Chucky (2017)

Directed and written by Don Mancini, and released on October 3, 2017, Cult of Chucky is the seventh installment and the second direct-to-video film in the franchise. It stars Brad Dourif, Jennifer Tilly, Alex Vincent, and Fiona Dourif, all reprising the roles from previous films in the franchise.

Chucky returns to terrorize his human victim, Nica, who is confined to an asylum for the criminally insane. Meanwhile, the killer doll has some scores to settle with his old enemies, with the help of his former wife.

Child's Play (2019)
 
Directed by Lars Klevberg, Child's Play (2019) is a remake and reboot of the original film. It is the first and only film to not feature Longtime Chucky actor Brad Dourif. It stars Aubrey Plaza, Gabriel Bateman, and Mark Hamill playing new versions of characters from the original film. In this film Chucky is not a doll possessed by a serial killer, but instead an AI powered Buddi doll.

After moving to a new city, young Andy Barclay receives a special present from his mother—a seemingly innocent Buddi doll that becomes his best friend. When the doll suddenly takes on a life of its own, Andy unites with other neighborhood children to stop the sinister toy from wreaking havoc.

Future
In October 2017, Don Mancini stated that he intends to have Glen and Glenda from Seed of Chucky return in a future film, and acknowledged that most references to that character had been cut from Cult of Chucky. Child's Play television series continuation Chucky was released in October 2021 and Mancini said that following the TV show, feature films will continue to be developed in the future.

In an interview with Bloody Disgusting, Mancini discussed the potential of a Child's Play film set on a train, as well as revealing plans for a crossover film with the A Nightmare on Elm Street franchise, tentatively referred to as Child's Play on Elm Street.

I would like to do Freddy and Chucky, just because I think they would be a fun double act. I'm more really interested in the characters. My pitch for Freddy vs. Chucky is Child's Play on Elm Street. Chucky ends up in some kid's house on Elm Street, and Chucky and Freddy inevitably meet in the dreamscape. Chucky sleeps. Why not? Chucky sleeps, Chucky dreams. And they have this admiration for each other. But they realize quickly that Elm Street isn't big enough for the two of them, so in a riff on Dirty Rotten Scoundrels they have a contest: who can kill the most teenagers before the sun comes up?

Mancini confirmed his intent to make the crossover film, describing it as "cool and doable", saying that the film would be titled Child's Play on Elm Street and that he was in discussion with New Line Cinema about the film. The foundation for a crossover film was previously laid in Bride of Chucky, in which Freddy Krueger's bladed glove had appeared in the Lockport police evidence depository at the beginning of the film.

Television

Chucky (2021–present)

A television series adaptation, titled Chucky, was released on October 12, 2021, with involvement from franchise creator Don Mancini and producer David Kirschner. The show aired on Syfy and USA Network and shares continuity with the original film series, and is a continuation of that story. Mancini stated that besides the TV series, feature films will still continue to be developed. Brad Dourif returned to voice Charles Lee "Chucky" Ray. Executive producers of the series include David Kirschner and Nick Antosca. Mancini directed and wrote the first episode.

In addition to Brad Dourif, Jennifer Tilly reprised her role as Tiffany in the series. Other cast members include Zackary Arthur, Teo Briones, Alyvia Alyn Lind, Björgvin Arnarson, Devon Sawa, Fiona Dourif, Lexa Doig and Barbara Alyn Woods. Alex Vincent and Christine Elise McCarthy reprised their roles as Andy Barclay and Kyle.

Short films

Chucky's Vacation Slides (2005)
On the home media DVD and Blu-ray release of Seed of Chucky in 2005, a short film entitled Chucky's Vacation Slides was included in the special features. The short, set after the shooting of Seed of Chucky, follows the movie stars Chucky, Tiffany, and Glen after having returned from a family vacation. While browsing through their photographs of their vacation on a slide projector, Tiffany notices various corpses in the background of certain photographs, realizing that Chucky has been killing people again. Tiffany leaves, with a distraught and sickened Glen, while Chucky continues to view the photographs. After a delivery man arrives with a pizza, Chucky leads him to his garage and kills him off-screen. Brad Dourif, Jennifer Tilly and Billy Boyd all reprise their roles from the films.

Chucky Invades (2013)
Leading up to the DVD release of Curse of Chucky in 2013, a series of short film videos were released. The clips showed Chucky interrupting the events of several other horror films. Brad Dourif and Edan Gross reprised their roles as Chucky and the Good Guys Doll, respectively. 
 The first clip, Chucky invades Psycho, has Chucky using a stepladder to kill Marion Crane in the shower; he is then discovered by Norman Bates. Janet Leigh and Anthony Perkins appear in archival footage. 
 The second clip, Chucky invades The Purge, has Chucky invading the Sandin family's home. Ethan Hawke, Lena Headey, Adelaide Kane and Max Burkholder appear in archival footage. The film is designed in the form of a trailer for a film.
 The third clip, Chucky invades Mama, follows Chucky as he hides under the bed of Victoria Desange before attacking her. Jessica Chastain and Isabelle Nélisse appear in archival footage.
 The fourth clip, Chucky invades Drag Me to Hell, follows Chucky attacking Christine Brown in her car. Alison Lohman appears in archival footage.

Cast and crew

Principal cast

Crew

Reception

Box office performance

Critical and public response

Controversies
The following crimes have been associated with the Child's Play films:

In December 1992, four people who tortured and killed 16-year-old Suzanne Capper were said to be influenced by one of the Child's Play films. During the torturing of the girl, the perpetrators taunted her by playing her a song, ("Hi, I'm Chucky (Wanna Play?)") by 150 Volts, featuring samples from the film Child's Play.

In 1993, two youths who abducted and murdered a toddler named James Bulger were said to have been influenced by the film Child's Play 3. The supposed link between the murder and the film was denied by film censor James Ferman.

According to a relative of two boys aged 10 and 12 who brutally attacked a nine-year-old and 11-year-old boy in Edlington, South Yorkshire in April 2009, the attackers watched horror movies, including Chucky films, from the age of about six or seven.

Elena Lobacheva, a Russian serial killer arrested in 2015, was reportedly obsessed with the film Bride of Chucky, which she cited as being an inspiration for the murders that she and her gang committed throughout Moscow.

In August 2019, billboards and posters promoting the 2019 Child's Play reboot were pulled in New Zealand after a complaint was submitted to the Advertising Standards Authority (ASA) for being inappropriate. The complaint was made mostly with concern for the region of Canterbury, claiming the advertisements are potentially traumatizing among children by reminding them of that region's high suicide rates, the various earthquakes that occurred, and the Christchurch mosque shootings. The ad depicted Chucky with red glowing eyes and a knife, the latter being intentionally obscured by the title. The poster was deemed not to cause any harm among the population, but the ASA concluded it would be frightening for children.

Music
Joe Renzetti composed the first Child's Play, followed by Graeme Revell, who composed the soundtrack for Child's Play 2 and Bride of Chucky. John D'Andrea and Cory Lerios wrote the score for Child's Play 3, while Pino Donaggio composed Seed of Chucky. Joseph LoDuca composed the score for Curse of Chucky and Cult of Chucky.

Other media

Comics

Innovation Publishing
Beginning in 1992, Innovation Publishing released the first comic books based on the films, in the form of a three-issue adaptation of Child's Play 2. It was later collected in a trade paperback. The success of the adaptation led to a monthly series of new stories starting in 1991. The series, titled Child's Play: The Series, ended in 1992 after only five issues. This was followed by a three-issue adaptation of Child's Play 3.

Devil's Due Publishing
In 2007, Devil's Due Publishing obtained the license to publish Child's Play comics and released a one-shot crossover with Hack/Slash titled Hack/Slash vs. Chucky which takes place after the events of the Seed of Chucky film. This was followed by a four-issue series called Chucky. A second volume began in early 2009 but ceased publication after only one issue.

Video game

Slimstown Studios made an endless runner video game titled Chucky: Slash & Dash. The game was released on iPhone, iPad, iPod Touch and Android devices. It is the result of an agreement with Universal Partnerships & Licensing to develop and publish the first officially licensed smartphone and tablet Child's Play video game. The gameplay is actually inspired by the second film's climax.

In the game, Chucky is stuck in a never-ending nightmare in which he's endlessly running through the factory that produces Good Guys dolls. Players control Chucky while sprinting through the factory floor, the catwalks, the warehouse, or even outside, and need to avoid conveyor belts, forklifts, acid pools, barrels and other obstacles. Chucky can also eliminate security guards patrolling the factory using his classic knife or other more outlandish weapons like a cleaver, screwdriver, or hatchet. As they play, gamers collect batteries that can be used to purchase in-game items or power-ups, such as a double battery bonus, a fast start, or extra lives that can extend a run after dying.

Universal theme park attractions
Since 1992, Chucky has starred in his own shows at Universal's Halloween Horror Nights, entitled, Chucky's In-Your-Face Insults and Chucky's Insult Emporium.

In 2009, the climax of Child's Play 3 received its own maze, entitled Chucky's Fun House. Curse of Chucky has also received its own scarezone in the 2013 lineup. In 2017, Chucky was the host of the Hollywood event's Terror Tram, joining Freddy, Jason, and Leatherface in terrorizing guests as a promotion for the then-new Cult of Chucky film. The following year, he featured in his own scarezone at the Orlando event.

See also
 Killer toy
 Haunted doll

Notes

References

 
Universal Pictures franchises
American supernatural horror films
Horror film franchises
Mass media franchises introduced in 1988